Paul Winters may refer to:

Paul Winters (American football) (born 1958), American college football coach
Paul Winters (hurler) (born 1994), Irish hurler

See also
Paul Winter (disambiguation)